Kvikk Lunsj (Norwegian: Quick Lunch) is the name of a chocolate bar that was launched by the Norwegian chocolate sweets manufacturing company, Freia, in 1937 and has been sold ever since — with the exception of a period during and after WWII. Between 1941 and 1949, production was halted due to a shortage of sugar and the lack of quality flour. The chocolate consists of four rectangular wafers covered in milk chocolate, with thinner layers of filler made from ground up discarded wafers and bars mixed with chocolate that is put between wafers in order to break the chocolate into pieces easier. The chocolate has been advertised as a "hiking chocolate", and it is often associated with skiing trips in Norwegian culture, especially during Easter vacation, where chocolate is often used to provide extra energy in packed lunches. Kvikk Lunsj is today owned and produced by Mondelez International and sold in Norway, Sweden, and Denmark.

In the course of one year, the average Norwegian eats nine Kvikk Lunsj chocolates. Three of these are on average consumed during Easter. 50 million bars are produced each year, of which between 400 and 500 tons are sold during Easter. A sizable proportion of sales are made in duty-free shops in Sweden and Denmark.

For many, Kvikk Lunsj has become a symbol of Norwegian culture, and there were therefore strong reactions when Freia replaced the packaging foil with an airtight packaging in 2005, in line with Freia's other chocolates. The packaging had been largely unchanged since 1938, and when the packaging was replaced, Facebook groups were created to show opposition. In the 1960s, Freia began printing the well-known  (Norwegian: the mountain code) on the back of the packaging.

Variants
The chocolate is also sold as larger chocolate bars under the name Kvikk Lunsj XXL. Kvikk Lunsj has also been sold in blueberry and orange flavors. The chocolate has otherwise remained unchanged from the original. The first chocolates that were produced were covered in dark chocolate, which performed poorly in the market. The product was almost entirely removed from the market until it was reintroduced with milk chocolate.

Kit Kat
Kit Kat is similar to Kvikk Lunsj. Kit Kat is a chocolate product that is sold internationally and was introduced in English markets by Rowntree Limited as "Rowntree's Chocolate Crisp" as early as 1935. This company was bought by Nestle in 1988. In 2006, Nestle was granted a trademark on the "four-fingered wafer shape" by the European Union Intellectual Property Office. However, in July 2018, the trademark was determined inadmissible by the Court of Justice of the European Union.

See also
 Mondelēz International
 Nestlé

References

External links
 Kvikk Lunsj official webpage 

Chocolate bars
Mondelez International brands
Norwegian confectionery
Norwegian cuisine
Norwegian brands